Bolshearslangulovo (Olo Arıślanğol) is a rural locality (a selo) in Abishevsky Selsoviet, Khaybullinsky District, Bashkortostan, Russia. The population was 136 as of 2010. There are 2 streets.

Geography 
Bolshearslangulovo is located 67 km west of Akyar (the district's administrative centre) by road. Bolsheabishevo is the nearest rural locality.

References 

Rural localities in Khaybullinsky District